Leonard Garment (May 11, 1924 – July 13, 2013) was an American attorney, public servant, and arts advocate. He served U.S. presidents Richard Nixon and Gerald Ford in the White House in various positions from 1969 to 1976, including Counselor to the President, acting Special Counsel to Nixon for the last two years of his presidency, and U.S. Ambassador to the Third Committee at the United Nations.

Life and career
Garment was born in Brooklyn, New York. He had two brothers, Charles and Martin. In 1949, he graduated from Brooklyn Law School and joined the law firm of Mudge, Stern, Baldwin, and Todd. He became the head of litigation and a partner in the late fifties. Garment met Richard Nixon when the politician joined the firm in 1963. (Later the firm would be called Nixon, Mudge, Rose, Guthrie, Alexander & Mitchell.) He assisted with Nixon's 1968 presidential campaign.  In 1969, Garment became a part of Nixon's White House staff as special consultant to the president. He advised the president and worked on various special projects—particularly in the areas of civil and human rights, Indian affairs, and the arts.

Garment was the author of two books: the autobiography Crazy Rhythm: From Brooklyn and Jazz to Nixon's White House, Watergate, and Beyond,  and In Search of Deep Throat: The Greatest Political Mystery of Our Time. Published in 2000, the latter book supported the theory that Deep Throat was John Sears. Before Deep Throat's identity was revealed in 2005 as being former FBI Acting Associate Director W. Mark Felt, Garment himself was a suspect.

Felt was listed as a possible Deep Throat in the book (as are many others), but was dismissed by Garment because the author believed the secret source had to have strong White House connections. He was mistaken in his selection of Sears, who told Garment explicitly that he was not Deep Throat. To prove his argument, Sears admitted that he was an anonymous source for Carl Bernstein, but Garment still did not believe Sears, a longtime friend, was being truthful about not being Deep Throat.

Garment had a long association with the arts, starting with his early career as a jazz saxophonist with Woody Herman's band playing with Alan Greenspan before he entered law school. In the 1970s, he was chairman of the board of the Brooklyn Academy of Music. More recently, he was one of the founders of the National Jazz Museum in Harlem. He was awarded the National Medal of Arts in 2005 as an arts advocate and patron.

Tim Russert credited Leonard Garment with getting him into the news business as Garment had a friend at NBC News who was looking to rebuild their news division.  Garment and Russert had previously worked together in 1976 during the U.S. Senate election of Daniel Patrick Moynihan.

Garment was a close associate of I. Lewis ("Scooter") Libby, as law partners, at Dechert, Price & Rhoads.

Garment died July 13, 2013 at his Manhattan home, at the age of 89.

References

External links

1924 births
2013 deaths
American jazz saxophonists
American lawyers
Nixon administration personnel
Brooklyn College alumni
Brooklyn Law School alumni
Jewish American writers
People from Brooklyn
Richard Nixon 1968 presidential campaign
United States National Medal of Arts recipients
White House Counsels
Jazz musicians from New York (state)